Valdezarza is an administrative neighborhood of Madrid belonging to the district of Moncloa-Aravaca.

References 

Wards of Madrid
Moncloa-Aravaca